Archduchess Helena of Austria (full German name: Helena Marie Alice Christine Josefa Anna Margareta Madeleine Walburga Blandina Cäcilie Philomena Carmela Ignatia Rita de Cascia, Erzherzogin von Österreich, Prinzessin von Toskana; 30 October 1903 – 8 September 1924) was a member of the Tuscan branch of the House of Habsburg-Lorraine and an Archduchess of Austria and Princess of Bohemia, Hungary, and Tuscany by birth. Through her marriage to Philipp Albrecht, Hereditary Duke of Württemberg, Helena was also a member of the House of Württemberg and Hereditary Duchess consort of Württemberg.

Early life
Helena was born in Linz, Upper Austria, Austria-Hungary, the second-eldest child and eldest daughter of Archduke Peter Ferdinand, Prince of Tuscany and his wife Princess Maria Cristina of Bourbon-Two Sicilies. Helena was raised with her three siblings in Salzburg and Vienna until the end of World War I in 1918 when her family emigrated and moved to Lucerne, Switzerland.

Marriage and issue
Helena married Philipp Albrecht, Hereditary Duke of Württemberg, eldest child and son of Albrecht, Duke of Württemberg and his wife, Archduchess Margarete Sophie of Austria, on 24 October 1923 in Altshausen. Helena and Philipp Albrecht had one daughter:

 Duchess Maria Christina of Württemberg (born 2 September 1924 in Tübingen), married on 23 September 1948 to Prince Georg Hartmann of Liechtenstein (11 November 1911 – 18 January 1998), son of Prince Aloys of Liechtenstein.

Helena died in Tübingen, Baden-Württemberg, a week after the birth of Duchess Maria.

Ancestry

References

1903 births
1924 deaths
People from Linz
House of Habsburg-Lorraine
Austrian princesses
Duchesses of Württemberg
Deaths in childbirth